Wamp'ar (Quechua for tripod, Hispanicized spelling Huampar) is a mountain in the Andes of Peru, about  high. It is situated in the Lima Region, Huarochirí Province, Carampoma District. Wamp'ar lies west of Ukrupata and northeast and east of the two lakes named Wachwaqucha and Wamp'arqucha.

References

Mountains of Peru
Mountains of Lima Region